Chichiri may refer to:

Chichiri, a neighbourhood in Blantyre, Malawi
Well (Chinese constellation)
Chichiri, a character in the 1990s Japanese manga series Fushigi Yûgi

See also
Chichiri Museum, a museum in Malawi
Kamuzu Stadium, Malawi, formerly known as Chichiri Stadium